Antonius Wilhelmus Matthias Theodore van Mierlo (born 24 August 1957), known in England as Tony van Mierlo, is a former Netherlands international footballer who played primarily as a left winger but can also play as a forward.

Van Mierlo was born in Soerendonk. He played for PSV Eindhoven, Willem II, MVV Maastricht and VVV-Venlo in the Netherlands, for Birmingham City in England and for R.W.D. Molenbeek, K.A.A. Gent and K.R.C. Harelbeke in Belgium. He won three caps for the Netherlands national football team in 1980. After his playing career ended he joined the coaching staff at former club Willem II, and went on to become chief scout and later technical coordinator for Roda JC.

Honours
RWD Molenbeek
Belgian Second Division winners: 1985

References

External links

 International appearances at Voetbalstats.nl

1957 births
Living people
People from Cranendonck
Dutch footballers
Dutch expatriate footballers
Netherlands international footballers
Association football forwards
Eredivisie players
Eerste Divisie players
English Football League players
Belgian Pro League players
Challenger Pro League players
PSV Eindhoven players
Willem II (football club) players
Birmingham City F.C. players
R.W.D. Molenbeek players
MVV Maastricht players
K.A.A. Gent players
VVV-Venlo players
K.R.C. Zuid-West-Vlaanderen players
Willem II (football club) non-playing staff
Footballers from North Brabant
Dutch expatriate sportspeople in England
Dutch expatriate sportspeople in Belgium
Expatriate footballers in England
Expatriate footballers in Belgium
Roda JC Kerkrade non-playing staff